The Aorangi Range (also known as the Haurangi Range) is a mountain range on the North Island of New Zealand. It is located in the Wairarapa region, extending more than 20 kilometres (12 miles) north from Cape Palliser, and is the southernmost mountain range on the island. The greater portion of these mountains are covered in native forest which is protected and set aside for public recreational use as part of the Aorangi Forest Park.

The Putangirua Pinnacles are located near the western edge of the ranges.

Mount Ross 
Mount Ross  is the highest point in the Aorangi Range.

References

Mountain ranges of New Zealand
Landforms of the Wellington Region